ISO 19092 Financial Services - Biometrics - Part 2: Message syntax and cryptographic requirements is an ISO standard that describes the techniques, protocols, cryptographic requirements, and syntax for using biometrics as an identification and verification mechanism in a wide variety of security applications in the financial industry. This standard provides support for policy based matching decisions for remote authentication and allows biometrics to be used securely with the ISO 8583 retail transaction messaging standard. A secure review and audit event journal syntax is provided that allows many of the security controls specified in ISO 19092-1 to be implemented. 

Cryptography standards
19092-2